Thomas Andrew Murray Kirk (17 January 1906 – 10 August 1966) was a Liberal party member of the House of Commons of Canada. Born in Yarmouth, Nova Scotia, he was an administrator and teacher by career.

He was first elected at the Digby—Yarmouth riding in the 1949 general election after local Liberal party members chose him as their candidate. After a redistribution of electoral districts, Kirk was re-elected for successive terms at Shelburne—Yarmouth—Clare in 1953 and 1957. He was defeated in the 1958 election by Felton Legere of the Liberal party.

In 1952 Kirk was a Canadian delegate to the Seventh General Conference of UNESCO in Paris.

Kirk died at the Kentville Sanitorium in the evening of 10 August 1966, aged 60.

References

External links
 

1906 births
1966 deaths
Liberal Party of Canada MPs
Members of the House of Commons of Canada from Nova Scotia
People from Yarmouth, Nova Scotia